Niko Karhu (born May 13, 1993) is a Finnish ice hockey defenceman. His is currently playing with TUTO Hockey in the Finnish Mestis.

Karhu made his SM-liiga debut playing with HC TPS during the 2012–13 SM-liiga season.

References

External links

1993 births
Living people
Finnish ice hockey defencemen
HC TPS players
TuTo players
Sportspeople from Turku
21st-century Finnish people